A reclaimer is a machine used in bulk material handling applications.

Reclaimer may also refer to:

 Reclaimer (Halo), a title in the video game series Halo
 USS Reclaimer (ARS-42), a salvage ship in the United States Navy

See also

 Reclaim (disambiguation)